The 2022 KNSB Dutch Single Distance Championships were held at the Thialf skating rink in Heerenveen from Friday 28 October 2021 to Sunday 30 October 2021. Although the tournament was held in 2021 it was the 2022 edition as it was part of the 2021–2022 speed skating season.

Schedule

Medalists

Men

Women

Source:

References

External links
 KNSB

Dutch Single Distance Championships
Single Distance Championships
2022 Single Distance
KNSB Dutch Single Distance Championships, 2022
KNSB